Stelio Zupancich (born April 7, 1958) is a Canadian former ice hockey player. He represented Canada at the 1980 Winter Olympics held in Lake Placid, where he scored one goal and three assists in six games.

He also played OHL hockey with the Toronto Marlboros and Oshawa Generals. He finished his career playing for the Toronto Varsity Blues, twice an all star and elected to the school's Sports Hall of Fame.

After hockey he had career with the Toronto-Dominion Bank, becoming a real estate vice-president, and is married to Trish, and they have a son, Leonard.

References

External links

1958 births
Canadian ice hockey left wingers
Ice hockey players at the 1980 Winter Olympics
Living people
Olympic ice hockey players of Canada
Oshawa Generals players
Ice hockey people from Toronto
Toronto Marlboros players